Plaid Loch (NS 485186) was a freshwater loch in East Ayrshire, now a remnant due to drainage, near Sinclairston and 2 miles (3 km) south-east of Drongan, lying in a glacial kettle hole,.

The loch
Plaid Loch is one of four small lochs recorded in the 1880s, two of them artificial, within the parish of Ochiltree.

Barlosh Moss
Barlosh Moss is a Site of Special Scientific Interest (SSSI) and possesses a significant moth population. Once part of Plaid Loch, it is now marshy land that is home to carex grass, heather, juncus, pine, birch and thorn.

Cartographic evidence
Robert Gordon's map of circa 1636-52 marks the loch lying close to Belston Loch and Auchencloigh Castle, slightly the larger loch and to the north on the same watercourse. Blaeu's map of circa 1654 taken from Timothy Pont's map of circa 1600 shows Plaid Loch and a Trinmaks River as the outflow. A location recorded as Lochhill lies to the north and East Plaid is nearby. The loch is roughly circular and slightly smaller than Belston Loch.

Molls map of 1745 shows a single loch that could be either Belston or Plaid. Roy's map of 1747 does not record the loch position, however a Laigh Plaid and High Plaid are marked. Armstrong's map of 1775 shows a substantial elongated loch with a Belston and a Drumsmiden nearby and an inflow from the north coming from the vicinity of Rattenraw (Rottenrow). In 1821 a rounded loch is clearly shown, fed by burns from Ochiltree and Glenconnor. In 1832 Thomson's map shows a rounded 'Plaid' with substantial surrounding marshlands; Laigh and High Plaid are recorded.

In 1880 the loch was situated amongst extensive marshland and scrub with an outflow passing the Rottenrow area into the Burnock Water and running eventually into the Lugar Water, with an inflow from Belston Loch. Barlosh Farm lies to the west and Laigh Plaid borders the site. A small island is shown in the south-west area. By 1896 only the core area of the loch still had open water and the island no longer existed as an independent entity. The 1950 aerial survey appears to show that the loch had been drained to the point where no open water was present. In the 1990s only a small area of marshy wetland is shown on the OS map

Uses
In 1840 and 1843 the loch was used for curling matches.

Auchencloigh Castle
Auchencloigh Castle or Auchincloigh Castle (NGR NS 4945 1666) is a ruined fortification in the vicinity of Belston and Plaid Lochs near the Burnton Burn, lying within the feudal lands of the Craufurd Clan, situated in the Parish of Ochiltree, East Ayrshire, Scotland.

Micro-history
John Millar, born in 1806, was a stonedyker and later a curling stone maker. He and his family lived at High Plaid (High Plyde) Farm. John died in 1889.

The area has seen extensive coal mining activity with an open cast mine and collieries at Drumsmodden, Polquhairn, Old Polquhairn, Auchlin, etc.

Early highways ran close to the loch, as indicated by names such as Glenconner, conaire being a Gaelic word for "path", and there is a farm called Rottenrow near to Glenconner, possibly derived from 'Route de Roi', or King's Highway.

See also
 Kerse Loch
 Belston Loch
 Loch Shield
 South Palmerston Loch

References

Notes

Sources

 Love, Dane (2003). Ayrshire : Discovering a County. Ayr : Fort Publishing. .

Lochs of East Ayrshire
History of East Ayrshire
Former lochs